The Battle of Hab, also known as the Second Battle of Tell Danith, occurred on August 14, 1119, where a Crusader army commanded by King Baldwin II of Jerusalem won a disputed victory over a Muslim army led by Ilghazi of Mardin since the Muslim army claimed it as a victory also.  The battle stabilized the Principality of Antioch, which had suffered a disastrous defeat only weeks before. Baldwin II managed to re-take all of the castles conquered by Ilghazi and prevented him from marching on Antioch.

Background
On June 28, 1119, Ilghazi's Turco-Syrian army destroyed the Antiochene army at the Battle of Ager Sanguinis. After his great victory, the Muslim leader's army captured a number of strongholds in the Latin principality, but more might have been achieved. "The failure of Il Ghazi to profit from his major victory ... was due not only to his own subsequent and prolonged drunkenness, but to the scattering of his forces in search of plunder."

As soon as he heard the news, King Baldwin brought a force north from his Kingdom of Jerusalem to rescue Antioch. On the way, he picked up a contingent from the County of Tripoli under Count Pons. Baldwin assembled the remnants of Antioch's army and added them to his own soldiers. Then he moved toward Zerdana, 65 kilometers east-southeast of Antioch, which was besieged by Ilghazi. While camped at the Tell Danith watering point, Baldwin found out that Zerdana had fallen. Accordingly, the Crusaders prepared to retreat to the stronghold of Hab, c. 25 kilometers southwest of Zerdana.

Battle
On the morning of August 14, Baldwin carefully arranged the Frankish army for its retreat through open country. Leading the way were three squadrons of 700 knights. Behind them marched the several thousand infantryman, composed of bowmen and spearmen. Count Pons with his Tripolitan knights guarded the right flank. A body of Antiochene knights under Robert Fulcoy protected the left flank. More knights from Antioch guarded the rear. Baldwin led a reserve of mounted knights from Jerusalem, but it is not clear in what part of the formation he marched.

The Artuqids hoped to provoke the Frankish cavalry into launching a premature charge or to open gaps in the enemy infantry formation. When such a favorable opportunity presented itself, they closed in to fight it out with lance and sword.

As anticipated, the Artuqid horse archers began harassing the column at dawn. Ilghazi's attacks soon increased in intensity and the Crusader army was probably brought to a halt fairly early in the day. The three vanguard squadrons were dispersed and the main body of Latin infantry came under serious attack. The infantry sturdily defended itself, but, without its normal cavalry support, suffered heavy losses.

On the left flank, Robert Fulcoy overcame the force opposed to him. But, after pursuing the Artuqids, he rode off with his knights to look into the possibility of retaking his stronghold of Zerdana. Meanwhile, the knights under Count Pons were scattered and some fled as far away as Antioch and Tripoli, spreading the news of a disaster. Count Pons and a handful of knights rallied to join Baldwin's reserve where they continued the contest.

With adroit use of his reserve knights, Baldwin saved the day. By intervening at each threatened sector, he held his army together during the long and bitter fight. Eventually, the Artuqids admitted defeat and withdrew from the battlefield.

Results
In Baldwin's narrow tactical victory, the Crusaders suffered serious losses. It may be surmised that the Turkish army also took painful losses, since Ilghazi withdrew his men from the fight, though he claimed victory nevertheless. One historian notes that, "without opposition, Baldwin was able to recapture some of the places lost." Strategically, it was a Christian victory which preserved the Principality of Antioch for several generations. The next major engagement in the area was the Battle of Azaz in 1125.

References

Footnotes

Conflicts in 1119
1119 in Asia
Battles involving the Kingdom of Jerusalem
1110s in the Kingdom of Jerusalem
12th century in the Seljuk Empire